Gwaha-ju is a traditional Korean fortified rice wine. The refined rice wine cheongju (also called yakju) is fortified by adding the distilled spirit soju to produce gwaha-ju. Popular varieties include gangha-ju of Boseong and Yeonggwang in South Jeolla Province, sinseon-ju of Namwon in North Jeolla Province, and yak-soju of Suwon in Gyeonggi Province.

Name 
The word gwaha-ju consists of three syllables: gwa meaning "to pass" or "to last", ha meaning "summer", and ju meaning "alcoholic beverage". The name suggests that the rice wine retains its flavor after the hot and humid summer, due to the fortification (addition of soju).

Regional varieties of gwaha-ju are called by their own regional names such as gangha-ju, sinseon-ju, and yak-soju ({{Korean|hangul=약소주|hanja=藥燒酒|lit="yakju cum soju'''"|labels=no}}).

Other names mentioned in old documents include gwaha-baekju in Sanga Yorok, a mid-15th century cookbook, and ohyang-soju in Imwon gyeongjeji, an 1827 encyclopedic compilation.

 History Gwaha-baekju was first mentioned in Sanga Yorok, a mid-15th century cookbook, but the rice wine was made without fortification. The earliest recorded recipe for fortified gangha-ju appears in Eumsik dimibang, a 1670 cookbook. Other Joseon books that mention the fortified rice wine include Jubangmun, Chisaeng yoram, Yeokjubangmun, Eumsikbo, Sallim gyeongje, Jeungbo sallim gyeongje, Gyuhap chongseo, and Imwon gyeongjeji.Gwaha-ju was a devised product for hot and humid summers in the Korean Peninsula, during which regular cheongju (rice wine) was hard to brew and easily spoiled, and regular soju (distilled liquor) was too strong. The fortified rice wine was a luxurious prestige drink made in the wealthy households of yangban gentries in the early 15th century, but gradually spread and became popular among commonality.

Many legacy gwaha-ju recipes disappeared due to the harsh periods of Japanese forced occupation (1910–1945) and the Korean War (1950–1953). Today, only a few regional varieties such as gangha-ju of Boseong and Yeonggwang in South Jeolla Province, sinseon-ju of Namwon in North Jeolla Province, and yak-soju of Suwon in Gyeonggi Province, survive, with the recipes being transmitted within families.

 Varieties and brewing 
A recipe for gwaha-ju in the 17th century cookbook Eumsik dimibang states: 
A bottle of boiled and cooled water is added to nuruk (fermentation starter) powder and set aside overnight, strained with additional sterile water. A mal of glutinous rice is steamed, cooled, and mixed with the nuruk-solution. After 3 days of primary fermentation, 20 bokja of soju (distilled liquor) is added to the rice wine. The fortified rice wine is consumed after 7 days of secondary fermentation.

A recipe for gwaha-ju in the 1809 encyclopaedia Gyuhap chongseo states: 
1–2 doe of white non-glutinous rice is cooked into beombeok (thick porridge), cooled, and mixed with nuruk powder. A mal of glutinous rice is steamed, cooled, and mixed with the nuruk mixture. After 7 days of primary fermentation, 20 bokja of soju (distilled liquor) is added to the rice wine.

Today, family recipes passed down through generations usually utilize various medicinal herbs as supplementary ingredients. A recipe in the 1827 document Imwon gyeongjeji states that ohyang-soju (five flavour distilled liquor) is made by: "brewing rice wine with cooked glutinous rice and nuruk (fermentation starter); adding powdered herbs such as sandalwood, costus, snowparsley, and clove, as well as whole walnuts and jujubes and soju (distilled liquor) after the primary fermentation; sealing hermetically for the secondary fermentation; opening the wine jar after 7 days and sealing again; and letting age for 29 days."

 Boseong gangha-ju 
Boseong gangha-ju is the fortified rice wine brewed in Do Hwa-ja's house in Boseong County, South Jeolla Province. The family recipe uses jujubes, ginger, and gotgam (dried persimmon).

 Namwon sinseon-ju 
Namwon sinseon-ju is the fortified rice wine brewed in Gim Gil-im's house in Namwon, South Jeolla Province. The family recipe uses pine needles, mung beans, chestnuts, ginseng, dried poria, and bamboo leaves.

 Suwon yak-soju 
Suwon yak-soju is the fortified rice wine brewed in Gim Myeong-ja's house in Suwon, Gyeonggi Province. The family recipe uses longan, dried ginseng, steamed jujubes, ginger juice, and cinnamon.

 Yeonggwang gangha-ju 
Yeonggwang gangha-ju'' is the fortified rice wine brewed in Jo Hui-ja's house in Yeonggwang County, South Jeolla Province. The family recipe uses roasted goji berries, steamed jujubes, ganghwal, longan, and ginger juice.

See also 
 Fortified wine
 List of Korean beverages

References 

Fortified wine
Korean alcoholic drinks
Rice wine